Bernard Dumaine (born August 20, 1953, in Angoulême, France) is a French artist best known for his work in photorealism and surrealism styles and for his background designs for television cartoons. He works in a variety of media, including oil paints, acrylic paints, graphite pencil, digital painting, digital collage, and video.

Life and work
He graduated in sculpture with a mention for drawing in 1977 in Angers ( Maine et Loire, France ). Many single and group exhibitions followed, both locally and internationally. His early work included drawings in the style of photorealist and surrealist oil paintings.

He is currently working mostly in digital media, oil paints, and pencil. He is also doing Exquisite corpse works in collaboration with many artists internationally, and these collaborative works have recently been exhibited in galleries across France.
70 of these collaborations, drawings and paintings, were part of his personal exhibition "Dreaming Deep" in Healdsburg, California, in 2019.

He has a DeviantArt page which also contains a link to this Wikipedia page.

Group exhibitions

"Painting with pixels" - Cork Gallery, New York City, USA (2004)

"32 bit Connection" - Museumsquartier (MQ), Vienna - Austria (2004)

International Surrealist Show 2006 - Spencer, Iowa

"Chimeria" - Sedan, France 2009

Energy Art Salon 2010 - Chicago, USA

Museu Brasileiro da Escultura - São Paulo, Brazil "Toyart" (2011)
                                                
Collettiva Surrealista "Linguaggi d'Arte" (2011) - Floridia, Italy

"Imagining science" - University of Reading (UK) (2013) - Exquisite corpses with Sally Hunter and Immy Smith

"Symbols and archetypes" - Dedalus Studi, Teramo, Italy (2013)

"Luci e Ombre, Tribute to H.R. Giger" Teramo, Italy (2015)

"Book Launch and Psychedelic Art Gallery" The Bently Reserve, San Francisco, CA (2015) 

"The resurrection of the Exquisite Corpse" Artworks, Richmond, VA, United States (2015) 

"Metamorphosis", Ripattoni in Arte, Palazzo Saliceti, Teramo, Italy (2016)

"Grand Opening", Phaneros Gallery, Nevada City, CA, USA (2017)

"Phaneros Family Campout", Nevada City, CA, USA (2017)

" Mainstreet Art Gallery" Dordrecht, The Netherlands (2019)

"Surreal Salon 14" Baton Rouge Gallery, LA, USA (2022) 

"Surreal Salon 15" Baton Rouge Gallery, LA, USA (2023)

Personal exhibitions

"Séries" - Galerie Rivaud, Poitiers, France (2014)

"Dreaming Deep" - Healdsburg, CA, USA ( March 2019 )

"Un autre monde" Galerie Art en Valois, Angoulême, France ( November 2021 )

Publications
 selected works in Renderosity: Digital Art for the 21st Century (2004, Collins Design) by John Grant and Audre Vysniauskas
 Search 02 in Issue #1, Dark Recesses Press (Dark Recesses Press, 2005)
 selected works in Metamorphosis (2006, Jon Beinart)
 selected work in Imagine The Imagination : new visions of Surrealism (2009, nEgoist Sp.z.o.o.)
 selected work in Visionary Art Yearbook  (2010, edited by Otto Rapp)
 " Miximages " 80 Exquisite corpses in pencils (Blurb, 2010)
 selected works in Anarchy Mag, Issue #70/71,#72/73,#74 (Freedom press, 2011–2013)
 selected works in Rebirth of the exquisite corpse (2011) by Anthony Mason
 selected works in Collaborative Corpse Yearbook 2010-2011 (2011, Blurb) by George Teseleanu
 selected works in Eco-Ar-Te para o reencantamento do mundo by SATO, Michèle (Org.) São Carlos: RiMa & Cuiabá: FAPEMAT, 2011
 selected works in Artelibre - arte y libertad VI (Editorial Comuniter, S.L.,, 2012)
 selected works in Biomech Art by Martin de Diego Sádaba (Graffito books) , 2013
 selected works in Lithaire by Pierre Petiot (La Belle Inutile Editions) , 2013
 selected work in The Horror Magazine by Jeani Rector (Horror Zine, The /2013)
 selected work in The spindle's arc by  J. Karl Bogartte (La Belle Inutile Éditions /2014) 
 selected work in Insidieux by Pierre Petiot (La Belle Inutile Editions) , 2014
 selected work in Mona Lisa Reimagined by Erik Maell  (Goff Books) , 2015
 selected works in Masters of Contemporary Art - Vol 2 (Art Galaxie) , 2016

See also

References

External links
 Deviant Art site

20th-century French painters
20th-century French male artists
French male painters
21st-century French painters
21st-century French male artists
Modern painters
French digital artists
1953 births
Living people